Meshchovsky District is an administrative and municipal district (raion), one of the twenty-four in Kaluga Oblast, Russia. It is located in the center of the oblast. Its administrative center is the town of Meshchovsk. As of the 2021 Census, the total population of the district was 11,529, with the population of Meshchovsk accounting for 33.0% of that number.

References

Notes

Sources

Districts of Kaluga Oblast